MS Motor TV is an Italian television channel devoted to cars and motorcycles. It is owned by Mediasport Group S.p.A. and available on Sky Italia and Tivùsat.

History
In 2007, MotoTV was started as a channel on Sky Italia devoted to motorcycle sports with dedicated programming. It was followed in early 2012 with Auto TV, which was free-to-air on digital terrestrial television.

On 29 September 2012, the two channels merged into Automoto TV. Mediasport acquired the channel in 2018 and renamed it MS Motor TV in 2020 as part of a rebranding of its four channels.

References

External links 
  

Television channels and stations established in 2012
2012 establishments in Italy
Italian-language television stations
Sports television in Italy